Julian Voss-Andreae (born 15 August 1970) is a German sculptor living and working in the U.S.

Life
Voss-Andreae's full first name is Johann Julian, in honor of his ancestor, German pastor Johann Valentin Andreae.
According to an interview with the artist, Voss-Andreae attended a Rudolf Steiner school in Germany from grades 9 to 13.

Voss-Andreae was born in Hamburg, Germany (formerly West Germany) and started out as a painter.  He later studied experimental physics at the universities of Berlin, Edinburgh and Vienna. Voss-Andreae pursued his graduate research in quantum physics in Anton Zeilinger's research group, participating in an experiment demonstrating quantum behavior for the largest objects to date. He moved to the U.S. in 2000 and graduated from the Pacific Northwest College of Art in 2004.

Voss-Andreae’s work is heavily influenced by his background in science. His work includes protein sculptures, such as Angel of the West (2008), a large-scale outdoor sculpture for the Scripps Research Institute in Jupiter, Florida portraying the human antibody molecule, a sculpture for Nobel laureate Roderick MacKinnon based on the ion channel structure, and the quantum physics-inspired Quantum Man (2006).

Recent work includes an exhibition at the American Center for Physics displaying a series of sculptures inspired by concepts from quantum physics.

In 2020 he was awarded the Waltrude-and-Friedrich-Liebau-prize for the Promotion of Interdisciplinarity in Crystallography by the German Crystallographic Society.

References

External links

www.JulianVossAndreae.com Home Page
Philip Ball's blog "homunculus" with Ball's 'Nature' review and Q&A with Voss-Andreae (November 2009)
Oregon Art Beat: Quantum Sculptures with Julian Voss-Andreae Oregon Public Broadcasting TV piece about Voss-Andreae's work (December 2008)
Protein Data Bank newsletter Interview: Julian Voss-Andreae, Protein Sculptor (pp. 9–11, January 2007)
Seed Magazine Interview: Seeing Below the Surface: Julian Voss-Andreae expands the molecules of life through sculpture. (May 2006)
Oregon Art Beat: Linus Pauling Statue Oregon Public Broadcasting TV piece about Voss-Andreae's Alpha Helix for Linus Pauling (May 2004)

1970 births
Living people
20th-century German sculptors
20th-century German male artists
German male sculptors
21st-century German sculptors
21st-century German male artists
Free University of Berlin alumni
University of Vienna alumni
Alumni of the University of Edinburgh
Pacific Northwest College of Art alumni
Artists from Portland, Oregon